Shanmukhapriya is a ragam in Carnatic music (musical scale of South Indian classical music). It is the 56th melakarta rāgam (parent scale) in the 72 melakarta rāgam system of Carnatic music. It is called Chāmaram in Muthuswami Dikshitar school of Carnatic music. It is said to be borrowed into Hindustani music from Carnatic music. Many compositions on Lord Murugan and Lord Shiva are based on this raaga.

Structure and Lakshana

It is the 2nd rāgam in the 10th chakra Disi. The mnemonic name is Disi-Sri. The mnemonic phrase is sa ri gi mi pa dha ni. Its  structure (ascending and descending scale) is as follows (see swaras in Carnatic music for details on below notation and terms):
: 
: 

This scale uses the swaras chatushruti rishabham, sadharana gandharam, prati madhyamam, shuddha dhaivatam and kaisiki nishadam. As it is a melakarta rāgam, by definition it is a sampoorna rāgam (has all seven notes in ascending and descending scale). It is the prati madhyamam equivalent of Natabhairavi, which is the 20th melakarta scale.

Janya rāgams 
Shanmukhapriya has a few minor janya rāgams (derived scales) associated with it. See List of janya rāgams for scales associated with Shanmukhapriya.

Compositions 

A composition later set to Shanmukapriya
Muthai tharu pathi by Arunagirinathar

Here are a few common compositions sung in concerts, set to Shanmukhapriya.

Vaddane vaaru by Tyagaraja
Marivere Dikkevarayya by Patnam Subramania Iyer
Parvati nayakane, Saravana bhava ennum, Andavane unnai  by Papanasam Sivan
Abhimaanamutho Nannubrovaradha by Mysore Vasudevachar
Yake Bagila Hakiruvi By Vadiraja Tirtha
Mooru Namagala By Gopala Dasa
Hoo beke Parimalada, Kotta bhagyave sako, Januma Janumadali By Vidyaprasanna Teertha in Kannada
Acharavillada nalige  By Purandara Dasa
Valli Nayakane by Muthiah Bhagavatar
Vilayada idu nerama by T.N.Bala of USA
Sada tava pAda sannidhim by M. Balamuralikrishna
Omkara Pranava, a pada varnam in Shanmukhapriya by M. Balamuralikrishna
Siddhi Vinayakam, by Muthuswami Dikshitar
Stava Vârdita Vikramà by Kalyani Varadarajan
Mamava Karunaya by Swathi Thirunal Rama Varma
 Bavasagaram by Gopalakrishnabharathi

The compositions of Muthuswami Dikshitar, namely, Siddhi Vinayakam, Mahasuram Ketumaham,sadashraye and Ekamreshanayakim have their school's rāgam name Chāmaram mudra in them.

Film Songs

Language:Tamil

Janya 1:Ragam Sumanasaranjani/Samudrapriya/Madhukauns Tamil 
Ascending:S G2 M2 P N2 S

Descending:S N2 P M2 G2 S

Related rāgams 
This section covers the theoretical and scientific aspect of this rāgam.

Shanmukhapriya's notes when shifted using Graha bhedam, yields 3 other major melakarta rāgams, namely, Shoolini, Dhenuka and Chitrambari. Graha bhedam is the step taken in keeping the relative note frequencies same, while shifting the shadjam to the next note in the rāgam. For further details and an illustration refer Graha bhedam on Shanmukhapriya.

Shanmukhapriya corresponds to Hungarian Gypsy scale in Western music.

Notes

References

Melakarta ragas